Klement Steinmetz (23 March 1915 – 2 May 2001) was an Austrian football (soccer) player who competed in the 1936 Summer Olympics. He was part of the Austrian team, which won the silver medal in the football tournament. He played three matches as forward and scored three goals.

References

External links
profile

1915 births
2001 deaths
Austrian footballers
Footballers at the 1936 Summer Olympics
Olympic footballers of Austria
Olympic silver medalists for Austria
Austria international footballers
Olympic medalists in football
Medalists at the 1936 Summer Olympics
Association football forwards